Oleg Georgievich Goncharenko (18 August 1931 – 16 December 1986), Distinguished Master of Sports of the USSR, was the first male Soviet speed skater to become World Allround Champion.

Born in Kharkiv, Ukraine, Oleg Goncharenko made his international debut in 1953 and promptly became World Allround Champion. He would win two more World Allround Championships after that, as well as two European Allround Championships. In 1958, he won the "triple", becoming World, European, and Soviet Allround Champion. At the 1956 Winter Olympics of Cortina d'Ampezzo, Goncharenko won bronze on the 5,000 m and on the 10,000 m. He also participated in the 5,000 m at the 1960 Winter Olympics of Squaw Valley, but finished only sixth.

Both at home at abroad, Goncharenko was unusually popular for many years, even long after he had retired from speed skating. After winning his first World Championship in 1953 in Helsinki, he received dozens of telegrams in his hotel room there from all over the Soviet Union and from abroad. One of those telegrams he kept until the end of his life because it was particularly dear to him. It was a short message from the legendary Norwegian speed skater Oscar Mathisen, reading "Congratulations. Oscar Mathisen." – written just one year before Mathisen's death. Goncharenko's achievements also prompted two cities, Denver and Oslo, to name him an honorary citizen. He also was awarded the Order of Lenin.

Goncharenko retired from speed skating in 1962. He died in 1986, at the age of 55, after a painful illness.

Medals 
An overview of medals won by Goncharenko at important championships he participated in, listing the years in which he won each:

Personal records 
To put these personal records in perspective, the WR column lists the official world records on the dates that Goncharenko skated his personal records.

Goncharenko has an Adelskalender score of 183.636 points. His highest ranking on the Adelskalender was a third place.

References 

 Oleg Goncharenko at SkateResults.com
 Oleg Georgievich Goncharenko (in Russian)
 Results of Soviet Championships at SpeedSkating.ru
 Evert Stenlund's Adelskalender pages
 Historical World Records from the International Skating Union

1931 births
1986 deaths
Soviet male speed skaters
Russian male speed skaters
Ukrainian male speed skaters
Sportspeople from Kharkiv
Olympic speed skaters of the Soviet Union
Speed skaters at the 1956 Winter Olympics
Speed skaters at the 1960 Winter Olympics
Olympic bronze medalists for the Soviet Union
Dynamo sports society athletes
Olympic medalists in speed skating
Medalists at the 1956 Winter Olympics
Recipients of the Order of Lenin
Honoured Masters of Sport of the USSR
World Allround Speed Skating Championships medalists
Russian State University of Physical Education, Sport, Youth and Tourism alumni